Brainerd High School is a public high school in Brainerd, Minnesota, United States. It serves grades 9–12 and is a part of Brainerd Public Schools. It was designed by Stegner, Hendrickson, & McNut. 9-12 is all in the same building

In addition to Brainerd, the school also serves the communities of Baxter, Fort Ripley, Garrison, Merrifield, and most of Nisswa.

History
Brainerd High School was established in 1889 as the demand for a second special school, and eventually, its replacement in Crow Wing County needed to be fulfilled.

While the intended use for the school was for children with special needs, in 2007 the school was expanded to  help physically disabled children as well.

Brainerd High School (North and South campuses) are currently undergoing plans for major renovations, including a new fine arts auditorium connected to the North campus of the school. Improvements and renovations for many of the elementary schools and other schools in the region are also included in this referendum, which passed in spring 2018. Part of the referendum was including a performing arts center as an addition to the high school. On May 26, 2021, the performing arts center, named the "Gichi-ziibi Center for the Arts" which name is an Ojibwe translation of "big river" or "Mississippi River", had its grand opening.

Notable alumni
 Nate Eiesland – musician, member of the band On An On
 Joe Haeg – football player for the Pittsburgh Steelers in the NFL, played college football at North Dakota State University
 Brock Larson – wrestler; retired mixed martial artist

Jeremy Good - Local comedian and previous host of the Warrior Weekly newscast

 Josh Archibald – ice hockey player for the Edmonton Oilers in the National Hockey League
 Myer Skoog – basketball player, University of Minnesota and NBA Minneapolis Lakers
 Nick Anderson – MLB player for the Tampa Bay Rays
 Todd Revenig – professional baseball player
 Cole Smith – NHL player for the Nashville Predators
 Mike Schmitz – Catholic priest, public speaker, and podcaster
 Dennis Stamp – professional wrestler
 Jon Jelacic – professional football player in NFL, CFL.

References

External links
 Brainerd High School
 Brainerd High School Class of 1969
 Brainerd High School Class of 1970

Schools in Crow Wing County, Minnesota
Public high schools in Minnesota